Tess Gallagher (born 1943) is an American poet, essayist, and short story writer. Among her many honors were a fellowship from the Guggenheim Foundation, National Endowment for the Arts award, Maxine Cushing Gray Foundation Award.

Biography 
Gallagher was born in Port Angeles, Washington to logger and longshoreman Leslie Bond and gardener mother Georgia Bond. She studied with poet-intellectual Theodore Roethke in the University of Washington, earning both a bachelor’s and a master’s degree in English. She also attended the Iowa Writers' Workshop, where she made films.

In November 1977 Gallagher met Raymond Carver, a short story writer and poet, at a writers' conference in Dallas, Texas and their relationship very much influenced her literary work, which included helping to edit and publish his writing. Beginning in January 1979, Carver and Gallagher lived together in El Paso, Texas, in a borrowed cabin near Port Angeles, Washington, and in Tucson, Arizona. In 1980, the two moved to Syracuse, New York, where Gallagher had been appointed the coordinator of the creative writing program at Syracuse University; Carver taught as a professor in the English department. They jointly purchased a house in Syracuse, at 832 Maryland Avenue. In ensuing years, the house became so popular that the couple had to hang a sign outside that read "Writers At Work" in order to be left alone.

In 1988, six weeks prior to his death, Carver and Gallagher married in Reno, Nevada.

Tess Gallagher spends part of her time living in a cottage in County Sligo, Ireland, and has a long-time Irish partner.

Raymond Carver and poetry 

Raymond Carver influenced her to write the short stories that were collected in The Lover of Horses (1986).

She wrote Moon Crossing Bridge, a collection of love poems dedicated to Raymond Carver, who died in 1988.

She published the essay "Instead of Dying" in The Sun Magazine about Raymond Carver's life.

Distant Rain: A Conversation Between Jakucho Setouchi and Tess Gallagher 

Distant Rain, published in 2006, is a conversation between Tess and Jakucho Setouchi, a Buddhist nun from Kyoto, that happened in Japan in 1990. They spoke about poetry, Tess Gallagher's grief about Raymond Carver, and differences between cultures.

Boogie-Woogie Crisscross 

Tess Gallagher wrote the book of poetry Boogie-Woogie Crisscross in collaboration with Lawrence Matsuda. They sent each other emails with new poetry and ideas, then from these correspondences was gathered the book. The collaboration started when Alfredo Arreguin, Tess Gallagher's friend, gave her poetry by Lawrence Matsuda's about World War II and Japanese who were imprisoned in camp Minidoka located in the western United States. Tess Gallagher helped Lawrence Matsuda to find a publisher for the poetry about Minidoka and this was how their literary friendship began.

Teaching career
Gallagher has taught at various institutions including St. Lawrence University, University of Montana, University of Arizona, Syracuse University, Bucknell University, and Whitman College.

Selected works

Poetry 
Collections

Short fiction 
Collections
 
 
 
Stories

Essay collections

Other works
 
 Words Like Distant Rain (2006)

Anthologies

References

External links
The Tess Gallagher Literary Archive at The Ohio State University Libraries Rare Books and Manuscripts Collection

1943 births
Living people
American essayists
American short story writers
American women essayists
American women poets
American women short story writers
The Atlantic (magazine) people
University of Washington alumni
University of Arizona faculty
St. Lawrence University faculty
University of Montana faculty
Bucknell University faculty
Syracuse University faculty
Whitman College faculty
Writers from Port Angeles, Washington
American women academics
21st-century American women